Monosomy is a form of aneuploidy with the presence of only one chromosome (instead of the typical two in humans) from a pair, which affects chromosome 14. Fetuses with monosomy 14 are not viable.  Only mosaic cases exist and these usually present with severe symptoms such as intellectual disability, ocular colobomata, microcephaly, and seizures.

References

External links

Autosomal monosomies and deletions